is a multi-purpose stadium in Saga, Japan.  It is currently used mostly for football matches.  The stadium was originally opened in 1970 and has a capacity of 17,000 spectators.

History
It was built to use by the National Sports Festival of Japan held in Saga-ken in 1976. Tosu Futures (It dismissed in 1997) of Japan Football League used for 3 years from 1994 as a temporary home ground. After 1997, Sagan Tosu is holding a home game irregularly.

References

Football venues in Japan
Multi-purpose stadiums in Japan
Sports venues in Saga Prefecture
Saga (city)
Sports venues completed in 1970
1970 establishments in Japan
Sagan Tosu